Happy Ever After is a song by English singer-songwriter Julia Fordham, included on her self-titled debut album. Released as a single in 1988, it reached #27 in the UK Singles Chart and number 1 in the Japan Singles Chart. "Happy Ever After" was inspired by Nelson Mandela's struggle through apartheid in South Africa and his imprisonment. The song was re-recorded for Fordham's 1998 compilation album, The Julia Fordham Collection, and given the subtitle "Rain Forest Mix '98".

Singer Jaki Graham recorded a cover version of "Happy Ever After" for her 1998 album My Life.

References

External links
"Happy Ever After" at Discogs

1988 songs
1988 singles
Julia Fordham songs
Songs about Nelson Mandela
Oricon Weekly number-one singles
Virgin Records singles